Areus may refer to:
Areus I, king of Sparta from 309 to 265 BC, son of prince Acrotatus, grandson of Cleomenes II
Areus II, king of Sparta from 262 to 254 BC, son of king Acrotatus, grandson of Areus I; he died in infancy
Areus (mythology), a minor figure in Peloponnesian mythology, son of Ampyx, father of Agenor